Coin is an unincorporated community in eastern Carroll County, Arkansas, United States.

The community is just east of Dry Creek on County Road 421 approximately four miles northwest of Alpena. Hough on U.S. Route 62 is about two miles south on County Road 807.

References

Unincorporated communities in Carroll County, Arkansas
Unincorporated communities in Arkansas